Mickey Virus is 2013 Indian comedy thriller film, written & directed by Saurabh Varma. Mickey Virus is produced by DAR Motion Pictures in association with Trilogic Digital Media Limited & Awesome Films Pvt. Ltd. The film features Manish Paul, Elli Avram, Manish Choudhary, Puja Gupta, and Varun Badola as main characters. The film, despite being a box-office failure, received positive reviews from critics.

Plot
When two Hackers were murdered in Delhi, Delhi Police suspects that the case revolves around hacking, they begin their search to find a computer hacker who can help them crack this case. The head of the police team ACP Siddhanth accompanied by Inspector Bhalla, stumbles across Mickey Arora, a lazy but smart hacker who runs a grocery store in day time and creates viruses for anti-virus companies in the night along with his friends tomboy Chutney, Floppy, Pancho and Professor who assist him in all odd jobs. ACP Siddhanth hires him to hack down the website of a group of cybercriminals known as Bhram Gang. Meanwhile, Mickey falls in love with Kamayani (Elli Avram) an employee of Excalibur Securities. One day in her office Kamayani wrongly transferred a big amount from a client's account but to avoid her from being fired Mickey hacks the company's website to reverse the transaction. Only the next morning does Micky realise that he has unknowingly stolen 1 billion rupees from a Dubai-based don named Anwar Raja and Kamayani has been murdered. Scared of being framed for both the crimes Mickey seeks help from his friends. In the quest to search for the real culprit Mickey traced down 1 billion rupees and finds out that ACP Siddhanth is the mastermind who forced Kamayani to bluff him. Mickey calls ACP and his friends to the parking lot of Nehru Place where ACP tells him that his friends Floppy, Pancho and Professor are the Bhram Gang admins and want to kill him for the money as they did to the two hackers and Kamayani. Surrounded by all the goons Mickey records and telecasts their confession on YouTube. In the end, Inspector Bhalla, along with police force, arrests ACP Siddhanth and the Bhram Gang. Mickey secretly takes one crore from the stolen 1 billion before handing it over to Inspector Bhalla. Credits roll to show few deleted scenes and bloopers and plays call recording of Anwar Raja who orders for killing Mickey

Cast
 Manish Paul as Mickey Arora
 Elli Avram as Kamayani
 Manish Choudhary as ACP Siddhanth Chauhan
 Varun Badola as Inspector Devender Bhalla
 Puja Gupta as Chutney
 Nitesh Pandey as Professor
 Raghav Kakkar as Floppy
 Vikesh Kumar as Pancho

Crew
 Written and Directed by: Saurabh Varma
 Screenplay: Saurabh Varma
 Script Consultant: Kuldeep Ruhil
 Producers: Arun Rangachari and Vivek Rangachari
 Co-Producers: Kamlesh Gori, Murad Khetani, Vishal Gurnani, Nailesh Mehta, Dharmesh Shah and Raj Deshpande
 Associate Producers: Pradeep Nimani and Murli Chhatwani
 Title Song: Faizan – Agnel
 Director of Photography: Anshuman Mahalay
 Executive Producer: Meraj Shaikh
 Creative Producer: Nikhil Bhat
 Editor: Archit D. Rastogi
 Audiography: Subash Sahoo
 Assistant Director: Raghav Gupta

Production
The film was shot in New Delhi, including in office complex of Nehru Place. Several Bollywood biggies like Salman Khan, Madhuri Dixit, Ranbir Kapoor, Anil Kapoor and Karan Johar featured in a promotional video of Mickey Virus. The movie has come under the scanner of Governmental Agencies as it displays techniques of high-profile robbery which might spur reel to real life robbery incidents. Elli Avram is also one of the contestants of Bigg Boss 7. She would be inside the House of Bigg Boss, cut off from the outside world at the time of Movie Release, making it a first of its kind Bollywood Debut. Mickey Virus is made on a budget of Rs. 110 million, which includes publicity and advertising, and it was released in 1,200 screens in India. Chances are that the film will be remade in Tamil and Telugu.

Soundtrack

The Soundtrack was released on 3 October 2013 on the digital music platform iTunes. The album consists of six tracks and the only one of them by Faizan Hussain & Agnel Roman, Manoj Yadav and Arun Kumar writing the lyrics.

Marketing
Mickey Virus was promoted by Manish Paul in Bigg Boss on Colors. A promotional clip of Mickey Virus featured Salman Khan, Ranbir Kapoor, Anil Kapoor, Madhuri Dixit Nene, Farah Khan, Karan Johar, Remo D'souza, Kapil Sharma, either dishing out funny one-liners or abusing Mickey. Lauren Gottlieb, Drashti Dhami, Jeetendra and Manish's TV friends Vahbbiz Dorabjee, Vivian Dsena attended the special screening of Mickey Virus.

Critical reception
Mickey Virus received positive to mixed reviews. Taran Adarsh of Bollywood Hungama gave it 3 out of 5 stars, finding the thriller to be engaging for younger viewers. Madhureeta Mukherjee of Times of India gave it 3 out of 5 stars. Mohar Basu of Koimoi gave it 2.5 out of 5 stars. Rajeev Masand of CNN-IBN gave it 2 out of 5 stars, criticizing the length and engagement. Faheem Ruhani of India Today gave it 3 out of 5 stars. Saibal Chatterjee of NDTV gave it 2.5 out of 5 stars. Tushar Joshi of DNA gave it 2.5 stars. Shubhra Gupta of Indian Express gave it 2 stars. Sanjukta sharma of Livemint did not give a rating, but found the film to have a weak plot and premise. Anupama Chopra gave it 2 stars. Zee News gave it 3.5 stars. Nikhil Arora of DesiMartini gave it 2 stars.

Box office
Mickey Virus got a 15–20% opening and collected around  nett on first day. It collected  nett in its first week and it was declared flop in box office India.

References

External links
 Official website
 
 
 

2010s Hindi-language films
2010s comedy thriller films
2013 films
Indian comedy thriller films
2013 comedy films